Hector John Sutherland (6 March 1930 – 26 April 2011) was an Australian racing cyclist. He finished in second place in the Australian National Road Race Championships in 1953 and 1954. He won a gold medal in men's road race event at the 1950 Commonwealth Games.

References

External links
 

1930 births
2011 deaths
Australian male cyclists
Place of birth missing
Cyclists at the 1950 British Empire Games
Commonwealth Games gold medallists for Australia
Commonwealth Games medallists in cycling
Medallists at the 1950 British Empire Games